The 2013–14 Florida Gulf Coast Eagles women's basketball team will represent Florida Gulf Coast University (FGCU) in the 2013–14 NCAA Division I women's basketball season. FGCU is a member of the Atlantic Sun Conference.

Roster changes

Departures
 Lerrin Cook, (now Lerrin Michel) a senior with the 2012–13 team, graduated.
 Brittany Kennedy, a senior with the 2012–13 team, graduated, and signed a professional contract with the Saarlouis Royals located in Saarlouis, Germany.
 Betsy Adams, who played one year at FGCU after four years at Valparaiso  completed her remaining year of eligibility. She played three seasons for the Crusaders, then missed her senior year with an injury, and transferred to FGCU as a graduate student.
 Joyce Iamstrong, a senior with the 2012–13 team, graduated.

Incoming players

 Kaneisha Atwater—sophomore transfer from Virginia Commonwealth
 Randa Payne—a walk-on freshman from Mansfield, Ohio
 Haley Laughter—a freshman from Asheville, North Carolina
 Morgan Blumer—a freshman from Milton, Wisconsin

Status changes
Taylor Gradinjan played limited minutes in 2012–13 due to an ACL tear, but re-injured the same knee in September and will miss this entire season. Kaneisha Atwater transferred to FGCU from Virginia Commonwealth; the NCAA initially denied the request for a waiver of the standard rule requiring transfers to sit out a year because she is moving institutions to be closer to her son but later approved the request after FGCU appealed the decision. Stephanie Haas played the 2012–13 as a walk-on, but earned a scholarship for the current season. Jessica Cattani is a freshman who tried out and made the team as a walk-on. Jenna Cobb joined the team a year ago as a transfer from Butler, but sat out the 2012–13 season per transfer rules.

Roster

Schedule
All conference games not shown on ESPN3 will be shown on A-Sun.TV. The home game against Bethune-Cookman will also be shown on A-Sun.TV.

|-
! colspan=11 style="background:#; color:white;"|Atlantic Sun Tournament

|-
! colspan=11 style="background:#; color:white;"|NCAA tournament

References

Florida Gulf Coast
Florida Gulf Coast Eagles women's basketball seasons
Florida Gulf Coast Eagles women's basketball
Florida Gulf Coast Eagles women's basketball
Florida Gulf Coast